Diphydontosaurus is an extinct genus of rhynchocephalian reptile from the Late Triassic of England and Italy. This small animal was related to the living tuatara (Sphenodon). It is more derived than Gephyrosaurus, yet more primitive than Planocephalosaurus, and shares traits with both of them.

Description
It had long, sharp claws to help it catch its prey, and peg-like piercing teeth to help it eat insects. These features are shared with the other primitive rhynchocephalians Gephyrosaurus and Planocephalosaurus.

Classification
Diphydontosaurus is known from many mostly complete specimens, which means that its classification as a rhynchocephalian is quite certain. In an analysis by Oliver Rauhut and colleagues in 2012, it was found that Diphydontosaurus is the second most basal rhynchocephalian, after Gephyrosaurus, and the most primitive sphenodontian, more primitive than Planocephalosaurus. Their analysis is shown below:

Paleoecology
Diphydontosaurus was a small animal that lived in the Bristol Channel region of England, and Italy. In the Bristol Channel, it lived during the Triassic about 205 mya. The deposits in which it is from are complete enough for its ecosystem to be reconstructed in 2012. In the Late Triassic, the regions that Diphydontosaurus lived in were numerous rocky, small caves, that sat on a limestone bed. It is likely that the caves were eroded by possibly acidic rainwater. Diphydontosaurus is very well known from these deposits, potentially because they drowned after a rainstorm or monsoon. In the cavernous system, the small sphenodontians like Diphydontosaurus probably fed on insects. Diphydontosaurus existed from 231–200 mya in both England and Italy combined.

References

Footnotes

Citations
 

 

Sphenodontia
Late Triassic reptiles of Europe
Prehistoric reptile genera